Element Lad (Jan Arrah) is a character appearing in DC Comics, primarily as a member of the Legion of Super-Heroes in the 30th and 31st centuries. A native of the planet Trom, he has the power to transmute chemical elements.

Publication history
Element Lad first appeared in Adventure Comics #307 and was created by Edmond Hamilton and John Forte.

Fictional character biography

Pre-Zero Hour
Element Lad first appears in Adventure Comics (vol. 1) #307 (1963). In this first story he is briefly known as "Mystery Lad" as the Legionnaires try to guess his superpower. Jan is the last survivor of Trom; with all of the planet's natives sharing Jan's abilities, the other Trommites had been massacred by the space pirate Roxxas for refusing to transmute valuable elements for him. Jan had only survived this genocide because he had been in space at the time.

With the aid of the Legion, Roxxas is brought to justice and Jan joins the Legion, using the codename Element Lad. He is a member of the Legion for many years, serving terms as leader and deputy leader. He is eventually linked romantically to Shvaughn Erin, the Science Police's Legion liaison, who herself first appeared in Superboy and the Legion of Super-Heroes #241 (July 1978).

"Five Years Later"
In November 1989 the Legion continuity jumps ahead five years; during this "Five Year Gap" following the Magic Wars, Earth had fallen under the covert control of the Dominators, and had withdrawn from the United Planets. In a storyline written by Tom and Mary Bierbaum, it is revealed in Legion of Super-Heroes (vol. 4) #31 (July 1992) that Shvaughn had been born as a male named Sean, and had taken a futuristic sex-change drug called ProFem to secure Element Lad's love. With ProFem no longer available in the tough economical times, Shvaughn reverts to Sean; Jan is unfazed, saying "Look, it doesn't matter. Don't you understand ... ? Anything we ever shared physically ... it was in spite of the ProFem, not because of it ... !"

At the same time, the Dominators' highly classified "Batch SW6" escapes captivity. Originally, Batch SW6 appears to be a group of teenage Legionnaire clones, created from samples apparently taken just prior to Ferro Lad's death at the hands of the Sun-Eater. Later, they are revealed to be time-paradox duplicates. After Earth is destroyed in a disaster reminiscent of the destruction of Krypton over a millennium earlier, a few dozen surviving cities and their inhabitants reconstitute their world as New Earth. The SW6 Legionnaires remain, and their version of Element Lad assumes the code name Alchemist.

Post-Zero Hour
After Legion of Super-Heroes (vol. 4) #61 (September 1994), DC Comics rebooted the Legion continuity as part of the Zero Hour company-wide crossover storyline. In post-Zero Hour continuity, Jan is still the last survivor of Trom, however the Trommites had been killed by the heat vision of Daxamite White Triangle terrorists who had decimated Trom from space. After a brief period of the traumatized Jan being brainwashed into becoming the villainous Starfinger, this version of Element Lad serves with the Legion for some time. Jan's previous history with Shvaughn Erin is erased in this continuity.

After an encounter with the sorcerer Mordru, Jan's powers change so that he can transmute himself into elements as well; he is subsequently often seen in metal or crystal forms, exploring the nature of his physical self.

In the Legion Lost limited series (2000–2001) it is shown that the events from "Widening Rifts" had caused Element Lad to become lost in deep space for billions of years, whereby his perspective changes to a point of arguable insanity and he becomes the extremely powerful villain Progenitor. He is eventually killed during this story by Live Wire (Garth Ranzz, the Legionnaire formerly known before Zero Hour as Lightning Lad), who sacrifices his own life in the process, but Garth later reappears in another form. Kid Quantum had taken the few crystals left from the destruction of the Progenitor and had left them on Shanghalla, the heroes' resting place. It turns out that Garth's essence had survived in the crystals; Jan's body had regrown, but housing Garth's consciousness. The reincarnated Garth is able to use both the Element Lad and Lightning Lad powers in his new crystalline body, although his relationship with other Legionnaires (including former love Saturn Girl) is strained due to his outward resemblance to the Progenitor. Before this plot is resolved, the Legion's continuity was rebooted a third time in 2004.

In the Final Crisis: Legion of 3 Worlds miniseries (2008–2009), the post-Zero Hour Legion is brought to the pre-crisis Legion's timeline, to help battle Superboy Prime and the Legion of Super-Villains. During this time, the Pre-Crisis Brainiac 5 uses a specially charged lightning rod to increase the transmutation ability of Element Lad's body, allowing Garth to mutate the body itself into a match for his own.

"Threeboot"
In the Waid/Kitson 'reimagining' Element Lad is the lone survivor of a lost planet. This most recent version has to touch things to transmute them, and anything he transmutes reverts to its original chemical composition in a matter of minutes; both are limitations he never had before (all previous versions of Element Lad have been able to transmute matter permanently and to do so from great distances).

He finds physical fights barbaric and has romantic feelings toward Triplicate Girl.

This Element Lad and the corresponding Legion also appear in Final Crisis: Legion of 3 Worlds. He turns the ground around Superboy-Prime into Kryptonite, causing him great pain. Superboy-Prime retaliates by throwing a Kryptonite rock through Element Lad's body, killing him.

Post-Infinite Crisis
The events of the Infinite Crisis miniseries have apparently restored a close analogue of the Pre-Crisis on Infinite Earths Legion to continuity, as seen in "The Lightning Saga" story arc in Justice League of America and Justice Society of America, and in the "Superman and the Legion of Super-Heroes" story arc in Action Comics.  This version of Element Lad is among a group of Legionnaires listed as missing.

Element Lad appears in Adventure Comics (vol. 2) #1, where it is revealed he is one of the Legionnaires stationed in the 21st century. He poses as Mr. Janson, the chemistry teacher at Smallville High School. As revealed in Adventure Comics (vol. 2) #8, Element Lad is part of a secret team sent by the late RJ Brande to the 21st century to save the future in the Last Stand of New Krypton storyline.

In the "Watchmen" sequel "Doomsday Clock", Element Lad is among the Legion of Super-Heroes members that appear in the present after Doctor Manhattan undid the experiment that erased the Legion of Super-Heroes and the Justice Society of America.

Powers
Jan has got the native power of Trom, which is the ability to change the elemental structure of any object, just by touching them. Element Lad can change one chemical element into any other, for instance, lead to gold or iron to aluminium. He can transmute an element even if it is part of a compound and can change solid objects into gaseous ones. Like all Trommites Element Lad could sense the elemental composition of any substance, and could change one element into another by creating or breaking electron bonds. As a member of the Legion of Super-Heroes he is provided with hand-to-hand combat training.

Abilities
His knowledge of chemistry is extensive, and Element Lad knows what elements to create to combine with other elements present to produce a desired effect.

Equipment
As a member of the Legion of Super-Heroes he is provided a Legion Flight Ring. It allows him to fly and protects him from the vacuum of space and other dangerous environments.

In other media
Element Lad made cameo appearances in the Legion of Super Heroes TV series.

References

External links
 A "Hero History" of Element Lad covering his many incarnations.

Characters created by Edmond Hamilton
Characters created by John Forte
Comics characters introduced in 1963
DC Comics aliens
DC Comics extraterrestrial superheroes
DC Comics LGBT superheroes
DC Comics male superheroes
DC Comics orphans
Fictional bisexual males
Fictional characters with elemental transmutation abilities